George and Martha is a series of children's books written and illustrated by James Marshall between 1972 and 1988. Each book in the series contains five short stories describing interactions between two hippos, George and Martha. The books inspired an animated children's television show which comprised 26 episodes made in 1999, and a musical made in 2011. The television series features celebrity voice talents Nathan Lane as George and Andrea Martin as Martha.

Plot 
The books describe the activities and adventures of best friends George and Martha. These activities include taking dance classes, going to the beach and the amusement park, and playing practical jokes on each other. In a humorous way, the series teaches about friendship. George and Martha sometimes argue, but always make up.

Books 
The George and Martha books comprise the following titles:
 George and Martha (1972)
 George and Martha Encore (1973)
 George and Martha Rise and Shine (1976)
 George and Martha One Fine Day (1978)
 George and Martha Tons of Fun (1980)
 George and Martha Back in Town (1984)
 George and Martha Round and Round (1988)
 George and Martha: The Complete Stories of Two Best Friends, with a foreword by Maurice Sendak (1997)

Television

Cast 
 Nathan Lane as George Hippo
 Andrea Martin as Martha Hippo
 Kathryn Greenwood as Frieda
 Colin Mochrie as Oscar, Bud Chuckles
 Debra McGrath as Valerie Chuckles
 Sean Cullen as Wilde, Eton
 Robin Duke as Penny
 Tony Rosato as Duke
 Greg Kramer as Anton

Production 
The series was animated by Canada-based Nelvana. The series has 26 episodes (with 52 segments) in order.

The series' theme song is "Perfidia", by Mambo All-Stars.

Episodes

Season 1 (1999)

Season 2 (2000)

Telecast and home media 
The series initially seen on YTV in Canada. In the U.S, the series aired on HBO Family, premiering on April 1, 1999. Repeats until 2009. The series returned to Qubo on March 28, 2016.
Select episodes of the series were released on VHS by Sony Wonder, under their "Doors of Wonder" banner.
As of 2017, YouTube's channel Treehouse Direct uploaded all the episodes of the series.

Musical 
George and Martha was turned into an original musical, George and Martha: Tons of Fun, by Imagination Stage in Bethesda, Maryland in 2011. It featured music, books, and lyrics by Joan Cushing and was directed by Kathryn Chase Bryer.

References

External links 

 

1990s American animated television series
2000s American animated television series
1999 American television series debuts
2000 American television series endings
1990s Canadian animated television series
2000s Canadian animated television series
1999 Canadian television series debuts
2000 Canadian television series endings
1990s preschool education television series
2000s preschool education television series
American children's animated comedy television series
American children's animated fantasy television series
American preschool education television series
Animated preschool education television series
Canadian children's animated comedy television series
Canadian children's animated fantasy television series
Canadian preschool education television series
Fictional duos
Fictional hippopotamuses
YTV (Canadian TV channel) original programming
HBO original programming
English-language television shows
American television shows based on children's books
Canadian television shows based on children's books
Television series by Nelvana
Australian Broadcasting Corporation original programming
Animated television series about mammals
Television shows set in the United States